Sir Robert Alfred Bolam (1871 – 28 April 1939) was a British medical doctor, academic and British Army officer. He served as Chair of Council of the British Medical Association from 1920 to 1927. He was President of the British Association of Dermatologists 1933-34. He was Vice-Chancellor of Durham University from 1936 to 1937.

Early life
Bolam was born in 1871 to John Bolam, a chemist. He was educated at Rutherford College in Newcastle upon Tyne, England.

References

1871 births
1939 deaths
20th-century English medical doctors
Vice-Chancellors and Wardens of Durham University
Royal Army Medical Corps officers
Presidents of the British Association of Dermatologists